Endiandra wongawallanensis  is a rare rainforest tree found in south eastern Queensland.

References 

Trees of Australia
Endangered biota of Queensland
Endangered flora of Australia
Plants described in 2021
wongawallanensis